Goofyfoot is an EP by folk singer-songwriter Phranc, released in 1995.

Recorded in Olympia, Washington with session musicians including Donna Dresch and Tobi Vail, as well as members of Satan's Pilgrims, Goofyfoot is an independent tribute to the surfer-punk ethic of the Californian coast. It covers "Mrs. Brown You've Got a Lovely Daughter" and "Ode to Billie Joe" as well as the popular live favourite "Bulldagger Swagger".

Track listing
 "Surferdyke Pal" (Phranc) – 2:38
 "Mrs. Brown You've Got a Lovely Daughter" (Trevor Peacock) – 3:11
 "Bulldagger Swagger" (Phranc) – 2:49
 "Ode to Billy Joe" (Bobbie Gentry) – 4:20
 "Goofyfoot" (Phranc) – 2:46

Personnel

 Phranc - Producer, vocals, guitar
 Warren Bruleigh - Producer
 Kaia Kangaroo - Guitar
 Dave Pilgrim - Guitar
 Scott Pilgrim - Guitar
 Donna Dresch - Bass guitar
 John Pilgrim - Bass guitar
 Patty Schemel - Drums
 Tobi Vail - Drums
 John Goodmanson - Engineer
 Tom Smurdon - Assistant engineer
 Greg Calbi - Mastering
 Carol Chen - Art direction, design

Release details

External links
 Amazon.com review
 Artist Direct review
 HR Music review
 Rate Your Music review

1995 EPs
Phranc albums
Kill Rock Stars EPs